The year 1947 saw a number of significant happenings in radio broadcasting history.


Events
10 February – Nederlandse Radio Unie is established.
17 February – Voice of America begins shortwave radio transmissions to the Soviet Union.
19 February – CBS Radio premiere performance of Villa-Lobos' Bachianas Brasileiras No. 3.
16 March – Margaret Truman, daughter of US President Harry S. Truman, performs in her vocal debut on national radio.
15 April – Operations begin at Radio Netherlands World radio.
21 April – On her 21st birthday, a speech by Princess Elizabeth, the future Queen Elizabeth II, is broadcast from Cape Town (where the royal family is on tour), delivering a pledge of service to the British Commonwealth.
1 June – Publication of the first number of Radio Nacional de España's fortnightly programme magazine Sintonía.
2 June – The Guiding Light is revived by CBS Radio after being canceled by NBC Radio the previous November. CBS would air "TGL" until 2009 on both radio and television.
20 October – Radio rights for the World Series in North American baseball sell for $475,000 for 3 years.
24 October – Francis Poulenc's Sinfonietta receives its world premiere in a broadcast concert from London having been commissioned by the BBC for the first anniversary of their Third Programme.
18 November – The BBC links up with stations around the globe in the programme BBC Covers the World.
(date unknown) – Philco Radio Time starring Bing Crosby, on the ABC Radio network, introduces taped broadcasting to primetime network radio. The show has formerly been recorded on large wax transcription disks.

Debuts

Programs
 2 January – Much-Binding-in-the-Marsh, having started out as a recurring sketch in the wartime comedy-variety show Merry-go-round (from 31 March 1944), debuts on the BBC Light Programme.
 11 January – The Amazing Mr. Malone debuts on ABC.
 19 January – Official Detective debuts on Mutual.  
 26 January – The Greatest Story Ever Told debuts on ABC. 
 27 January – Bob and Victoria debuts on CBS. 
 13 February – Family Theater (1947–1957) debuts on Mutual.
 28 February – Twenty Questions debuts on BBC radio.
 2 April – The Big Story debuts on NBC. 
 9 April – How Does Your Garden Grow? debuts on BBC radio; as Gardeners' Question Time it will still be running more than 65 years later.
 26 April – The Bill Goodwin Show debuts on CBS. 
 3 June – Call the Police debuts on NBC. 
 17 June – The Adventures of Philip Marlowe debuts on NBC. 
 23 June – Wendy Warren and the News debuts on CBS. 
 28 June – The Candid Microphone debuts on ABC. 
 29 June – Strike It Rich debuts on CBS. 
 7 July – Escape premieres on CBS.
 26 July – The Abe Burrows Show debuts on CBS.
 28 September – The Adventures of Christopher Wells debuts on CBS.
 6 October – Philip Odell, a fictional detective created by Lester Powell and played by Canadian actor Robert Beatty, is heard for the first time on BBC radio in Lady in a Fog.
 11 October – Joan Davis Time debuts on CBS. 
 27 October – You Bet Your Life, with Groucho Marx, premieres on ABC radio in the U.S.
 2 November – Round Britain Quiz debuts on BBC radio.

Stations
 January 6 - KWPC, Muscatine, Iowa, begins broadcasting on 860 kHz with 250 W power (daytime only).
 February – WBPZ, Lock Haven, Pennsylvania, begins broadcasting as a Mutual affiliate on 1230 kHz with 250 W of power.
 31 March – WNBD-FM, Daytona Beach, Florida, begins broadcast operations.
 4 April – WSVS, Crewe, Virginia, begins broadcasting on a frequency of 650 kHz.
 5 April – WRRZ, Clinton, North Carolina, begins broadcast operations on 880 kHz. with 1 KW of power.
 10 April – KCNA begins broadcasting on 580 Kcs in Tucson, Arizona.
 20 April – WMLO, Milwaukee, Wisconsin, begins broadcasting on 1290 kHz with 1 kW of power.
 23 April – WFNS-FM, Burlington, North Carolina, begins broadcasting.
 27 April – WFAK, Charleston, South Carolina, begins broadcasting on 730 kHz with 1 kW of power.
 27 April – WEEK, Peoria, Illinois, begins broadcasting on 1350 kHz with 1 kW of power.
 30 April – WMCK, Pittsburgh, begins broadcasting on 1360 kHz. 
 3 May – WSIC (1400 kHz, 250 W) and WSIC-FM (96.5 MHz), Statesville, North Carolina, begin broadcasting simultaneously with WSIC a Mutual affiliate and WSIC-FM duplicating the AM station's programming.
 5 May – WRON, Ronceverte, West Virginia, begins broadcasting as a Mutual affiliate on 1400 kHz with 250 W of power.
 9 May – KPBX, Beaumont, Texas, begins broadcasting on 1380 kHz.
 12 May – KATL, Houston, Texas, begins broadcasting on 1590 kHz with 1 KW of power. 
 14 May – KULA, Honolulu, begins broadcasting as an ABC affiliate. 
 16 May – KDIX, Dickinson, North Dakota, begins broadcasting on 1230 kHz with 250 W of power.
 18 May – WATG-FM, Ashland, Ohio, begins broadcasting on 100.7 MHz.
 23 May – WNAM, Neenah-Menasha, Wisconsin, begins broadcasting on 1280 kHz with 1 KW power. 
 30 May – WMID, Atlantic City, New Jersey, begins broadcasting as a Mutual affiliate on 1340 kHz with 250 W power.  
 1 June – WJMO, Cleveland, Ohio, begins broadcasting on 1540 MHz with 1 KW of power.
 2 June – WTMA-FM, Charleston, South Carolina, begins broadcasting on 95.1 MHz. with 1 KW of power.
 3 June – WHPE, High Point, North Carolina, begins broadcasting on 1070 kHz with 1 KW of power.
 7 June – WDIA, Memphis, Tennessee, begins broadcasting on 730 kHz with 250 W power. 
 8 June – WMMW, Meriden, Connecticut, begins broadcasting on 1470 kHz with 1 KW power. 
 12 June – KWSD, Mount Shasta, California, begins broadcasting on 1340 kHz with 250 W of power.
 14 June – KVOW, Littlefield, Texas, begins broadcasting on 1490 kHz with 250 W of power.
 15 June – KWBW-FM, Hutchinson, Kansas, begins broadcasting on 95.7 MHz, becoming the first commercial FM station in central Kansas.
 18 June – WRTA, Altoona, Pennsylvania, begins broadcasting as an ABC affiliate on 1240 kHz with 250 W power.
 20 June – WLCK, Lacrosse, Wisconsin, begins broadcasting on 1490 kHz with 250 W power. 
 22 June – KOOL, Phoenix, Arizona, begins broadcasting as a Mutual-Don Lee affiliate on 960 kHz with 5 KW power.
 23 June – WJHP-FM, Jacksonville, Florida, begins broadcasting. 
 27 June – WKBC, North Wilkesboro, North Carolina, begins broadcasting on 810 kHz with 1 KW power. 
 29 June – WDVA, Danville, Virginia begins broadcasting on 1250 kHz.
 30 June – KRTH-FM, Houston, Texas, begins broadcasting on 101.1 MHz.
 30 June – KIJV, Huron, South Dakota, begins broadcasting as a Mutual affiliate on 1340 kHz with 250 W power.
 1 July – KRON-FM, San Francisco, California, begins broadcasting at 96.5 MHz.
 1 July – WILX, North Wilkesboro, North Carolina, begins broadcasting as a Mutual affiliate on 1450 kHz with 250 W power.
 1 July – WIRK, West Palm Beach, Florida, begins broadcasting on 1290 kHz with 1 KW power.
 21 July – KBUR-FM, Burlington, Iowa, begins broadcasting on 92.9 MHz.
30 July – KOWL, Santa Monica, California, begins broadcasting on 1580 kHz with 5 KW power.
 July – KROS-FM, Clinton, Iowa, at 96.1 FM, with 13 kW power.
 1 August – WEBJ, Brewton, Alabama, begins broadcasting on 1240 kHz with 250 W power.
 3 August – KVER, Albuquerque, New Mexico, begins broadcasting on 1490 kHz with 250 W power.
 4 August – WIKY, Evansville, Indiana, begins broadcasting on 820 kHz with 250 W power.
 8 August – WIMS, Michigan City, Indiana, begins broadcasting on 1420 kHz with 1 KW power. 
 10 August – KRUL, Corvallis, Oregon, begins broadcasting on 1340 kHz with 250 W.
 10 August – WFTW, Fort Wayne, Indiana, begins broadcasting on 1090 kHz with 1 KW power.
 11 August – KOLN, Lincoln, Nebraska, begins broadcasting as a Mutual affiliate on 1400 kHz with 250 W power.
 11 August – WLOS, Asheville, North Carolina, begins broadcasting on 1380 kHz with power of 5 KW (daytime) and 1 KW (night).
 13 August – WJPG-FM (now WIXX-FM), Green Bay, Wisconsin, begins broadcasting on 101.1 MHz.
 15 August – KSEI-FM, Pocatello, Idaho, begins broadcasting on 96.5 MHz.
 15 August – KTIL, Tillamook, Oregon, begins broadcasting on 1590 kHz with 250 W power.
 17 August – WPDX, Clarksburg, West Virginia, begins broadcasting on 750 kHz with 1 KW power, daytime only.
 August – WIBV, Belleville, Illinois, begins broadcasting on 1060 kHz with 250 W power. 
 1 September – WWVA-FM, Wheeling, West Virginia, begins broadcasting on 98.7 MHz.
 10 September – WHCC, Waynesville, North Carolina, begins broadcasting on 1400 kHz with 250 W power. 
 14 September – WRFD, Worthington, Ohio, begins broadcasting on 880 kHz with 5 KW power (daytime only).
 14 September – KWBR-FM, San Francisco, California, is dedicated, broadcasting on 97.3 MHz.
 14 September – KDYL-FM, Salt Lake City, Utah, begins broadcasting on 98.7 MHz.
 19 September – KONG-FM, Alameda, California, begins broadcasting on 104.9 MHz.
 21 September – KSLO, Opelousas, Louisiana, begins broadcasting on 1230 kHz with 250 W power.
 29 September – WNMP, Evanston, Illinois, begins broadcasting on 1590 kHz with 1 KW power.
 September – WTNC, Thomasville, North Carolina, begins broadcasting on 790 kHz with 1 KW power.
 4 October – WGBA, Columbus, Georgia, begins broadcasting on 620 kHz with 1 KW power. 
 5 October – WSWN, Belle Glade, Florida, begins broadcasting on 900 kHz with 1 KW power.
 5 October – WBYS, Canton, Illinois, begins broadcasting on 1560 kHz with 250 W power (daytime only).
 5 October – WLAD, Danbury, Connecticut, begins broadcasting on 800 kHz with 250 W power (daytime only). 
 5 October – KSBS, Kansas City, Kansas, begins broadcasting on 105.9 MHz.
 8 October – KUSN, San Diego, California, begins broadcasting on 1510 kHz with 5 KW daytime and 1 KW nighttime power.
 8 October – KTXL, San Angelo, Texas, begins broadcasting as a Mutual affiliate on 1340 kHz with 250 W power (full-time).
 13 October – WBBC, Flint, Michigan, begins broadcasting on 1330 kHz with 1 KW power full-time. 
 15 October – KYNO, Fresno, California, begins broadcasting on 1300 kHz with 1 KW power full-time.
 15 October – KWIL-FM, Albany, Oregon, begins broadcasting on 101.7 MHz. 
 15 October – WKPB, Knoxville, Tennessee, begins broadcasting on 93.3 MHz.
 19 October – KGIL, San Fernando, California, begins broadcasting on 1260 kHz with 1 KW power full-time.
 19 October – KURV, Edinburg, Texas, begins broadcasting on 710 kHz with 250 W power (daytime only).
 19 October – WPGH, Pittsburgh, Pennsylvania, begins broadcasting on 1080 kHz with 1 KW power (daytime only).
 19 October – KOKX, Keokuk, Iowa, begins broadcasting on 1310 kHz with 250 W power (daytime only).
 21 October – WHUC, Hudson, New York, begins broadcasting on 1230 kHz with 250 W power.
 22 October – WJTN-FM begins broadcasting on 93.3 MHz.
 22 October – KSFH-FM, San Francisco, California, begins broadcasting on 94.9 MHz.
 26 October – KVFD-FM, Fort Dodge, Iowa, begins broadcasting on 102.7 MHz.
 27 October – WMBM, Miami Beach, Florida, begins broadcasting on 800 kHz with 1 KW power.
 28 October – WFRL, Freeport, Illinois, begins broadcasting on 1570 kHz with 1 KW power. 
 28 October – WHBF-FM, Rock Island, Illinois, begins broadcasting on 98.9 MHz. 
 29 October – KBMT-FM, San Bernardino, California, begins broadcasting on 99.9 MHz.
 (undated) November – WKLF begins broadcasting on 980 kHz with 1 KW power.
 (undated) November – WSID, Baltimore, Maryland, begins broadcasting on 1570 kHz with 1 KW power.
 1 November – WSLQ-FM, Roanoke, Virginia, begins broadcasting as WSLS on 99.1 MHz with 4,700 watts of power. 
 2 November – WCEC and WCEC-FM, Rocky Mount, North Carolina, begins broadcasting—the AM station on 810 kHz with 1 KW power (daytime only) and the FM station at 100.7 MHz.
 3 November – KGO-FM, San Francisco, California, begins broadcasting on 106.1 MHz.
 8 November – WGST-FM, Atlanta, Georgia, begins broadcasting on 94.1 MHz.
 8 November – KRUS, Ruston, Louisiana, begins broadcasting as a Mutual affiliate on 1490 kHz with 250 W power (full-time).
 9 November – KLIF, Dallas, Texas, begins broadcasting on 1190 kHz with 1 KW power. 
 10 November – WLAW-FM, Lawrence, Massachusetts, begins broadcasting on 93.7 MHz.
 10 November – WHMA-FM, Anniston, Alabama, begins broadcasting on 100.5 MHz.
 16 November – WJPD, Ishpeming, Michigan, begins broadcasting on 1240 kHz with 250 W power (full-time).
 16 November – KXEL-FM, Waterloo, Iowa, begins broadcasting on 105.7 MHz.
 16 November – KCRK, Cedar Rapids, Iowa, begins broadcasting on 96.9 MHz.
 17 November – KVNJ-FM, Fargo, North Dakota, begins broadcasting on 92.3 MHz.
 20 November – WJLK-FM, Asbury Park, New Jersey, begins broadcasting on 104.7 MHz.
 26 November – WVLK, Versailles, Kentucky, begins broadcasting as a Mutual affiliate on 1500 kHz with 1 KW power (full-time).
 27 November – WBMD, Baltimore, Maryland, begins broadcasting on 750 kHz with 1 KW power (daytime only).
 29 November – WTRF, Wheeling, West Virginia, begins broadcasting as a Mutual affiliate on 1290 kHz with 1 KW power. 
 29 November – WTRF-FM, Wheeling, West Virginia, begins broadcasting on Channel 236.
 (undated) December – WBOW-FM begins broadcasting on 101.1 MHz.
 1 December – WAFM, Birmingham, Alabama, begins broadcasting on 99.5 MHz.
 1 December – WSJS-FM, Winston-Salem, North Carolina, begins broadcasting on 104.1 MHz. 
 2 December – KREL, Goose Creek, Texas, begins broadcasting on 1360 kHz with 1 KW power (full-time).
 3 December – KSET, El Paso, Texas, begins broadcasting on 1340 kHz at 250 W (full-time).
 5 December – WHOO, Orlando, Florida, begins broadcasting as an ABC affiliate on 990 kHz with 10 kW power (daytime only).
 5 December – WTTH, Port Huron, Michigan, begins broadcasting on 1360 kHz with 1 KW power (daytime only).  
 5 December – WTTH-FM, Port Huron, Michigan, begins broadcasting on 99.1 MHz.
 7 December – WSKI, Montpelier, Vermont, begins broadcasting on 1240 kHz with 250 W power. 
 7 December – KFRM, Concordia, Kansas, begins broadcasting on 550 kHz with 5 KW power. All of its programming originated in the studios of KMBC, Kansas City, Missouri—the first arrangement of its kind to be licensed by the Federal Communications Commission. 
 7 December – WHVA-FM, Poughkeepsie, New York, begins broadcasting on 104.7 MHz. 
 7 December – WLEC, Sandusky, Ohio, begins broadcasting on 1450 kHz with 250 W power (full-time).
 12 December – KXAR, Hope, Arkansas, begins broadcasting as a Mutual affiliate on 1490 kHz with 250 W power.
 14 December – WCAV, Norfolk, Virginia, begins broadcasting on 860 kHz with 1 KW power (daytime).
 17 December – KVON, Napa, California, begins broadcasting on 1440 kHz with 500 W power (full-time).
 20 December – KCRG, Cedar Rapids, Iowa, begins broadcasting on 1600 kHz with 5 KW power. 
 21 December – WSGN-FM, Birmingham, Alabama, begins broadcasting on 93.7 MHz.
 21 December – WHBS-FM, Huntsville, Alabama, begins broadcasting on 95.1 MHz.
 25 December – KURV-FM, Edinburg, Texas, begins broadcasting on 104.9 MHz with 1 KW effective radiated power.
 29 December – WKAT-FM, Miami Beach, Florida, begins broadcasting on 93.1 MHz.  
 31 December – WOPT-FM, Oswego, New York, begins broadcasting on 104.7 MHz.

Endings
26 February – The Cresta Blanca Hollywood Players ends its run on network radio (CBS). 
23 March – The Eddie Bracken Show ends its run on network radio (CBS). 
28 March – Buck Rogers in the 25th Century ends its run on network radio (Mutual). 
28 March – Sparkle Time ends its run on network radio (CBS). 
2 April – Author Meets the Critics ends its run on network radio (Mutual). 
6 April – The Court of Missing Heirs ends its run on network radio (ABC).old-time radio 
13 April – Danger, Dr. Danfield ends its run on network radio (ABC).
4 June – The second version of Songs by Sinatra ends its run on network radio (CBS).  
11 June – The Ford Show ends its run on network radio (CBS).
23 June – Joanie's Tea Room ends its run on network radio (CBS).  
27 June – Bob and Victoria ends its run on network radio (CBS). 
25 August – Alec Templeton Time ends its run on network radio (NBC). 
31 August – Abbott Mysteries ends its run on Mutual.
16 October – Crime Club ends its run on network radio (Mutual). 
13 December – The Bill Goodwin Show ends its run on network radio (CBS). 
22 October – The Affairs of Ann Scotland ends its run on network radio (ABC).

Births
 1 March – Mike Read, British DJ.
 2 March – Joe Castiglione, announcer for the Boston Red Sox, author and college lecturer.
 17 June – Linda Chavez, Hispanic-American conservative author, commentator and talk show host.
 28 June – Gerry Northam, English radio presenter.
 5 August – Robert Krulwich, American topical broadcast presenter.
 1 October – Jane Dornacker (died 1986), American rock musician, actress, comedian and WNBC traffic reporter; killed in helicopter crash while live on air.
 20 November – Citizen Kafka (died 2009), New York City-based radio personality and folk musician.
 11 December – Steve Curwood, American journalist, author, public radio personality and actor.
 Natalie Wheen, English arts presenter.
 Peter White, blind English radio presenter.

Deaths
 24 July – Ernest Austin, English composer, arranger and songwriter associated with the Henry Wood Promenade Concerts (born 1874)

References

 
Radio by year